Muruqoba (also, Morukhoba and Murugoba) is a village in the Khachmaz Rayon of Azerbaijan.  The village forms part of the municipality of Ləcət.

References 

Populated places in Khachmaz District